Patricia Murphy may refer to:

 Patricia Murphy (restaurateur) (1905–1979), American restaurateur
 Patricia Murphy (referee) (born 1981), Irish snooker and pool referee
 Patricia Colleen Murphy, American poet and teacher

See also
 Pat Murphy (disambiguation)